Conspirator is a 1949 British film noir, suspense, espionage, and thriller film directed by Victor Saville and starring Robert Taylor and Elizabeth Taylor. Based on the 1948 novel Conspirator by Humphrey Slater, the film is about a beautiful 18-year-old American woman who meets and falls in love with one of a British Guards, an officer who turns out to be a spy for the Soviet Union. After they are married, she discovers his true identity and forces him to choose between his marriage and his ideology. When his Soviet handlers order him to murder his young American wife, he is faced with the ultimate choice. The film was made for distribution by Metro-Goldwyn-Mayer.

Plot

While visiting England, 18 year old Melinda Greyton (Elizabeth Taylor) attends a Regimental Ball where she meets handsome Major Michael Curragh (Robert Taylor). The attraction is mutual and a whirlwind courtship follows.

After the honeymoon is over the young bride finds out her husband is actually a Russian spy. She is frantic and cannot understand. After much discussion Michael decides to give up that life, but soon discovers the party orders him to kill his wife.

Cast
 Robert Taylor as Major Michael Curragh 
 Elizabeth Taylor as Melinda Greyton 
 Robert Flemyng as Captain Hugh Ladholme 
 Harold Warrender as Colonel Hammerbrook 
 Honor Blackman as Joyce 
 Marjorie Fielding as Aunt Jessica 
 Thora Hird as Broaders 
 Wilfrid Hyde-White as Lord Pennistone
 Marie Ney as Lady Pennistone 
 Jack Allen as Raglan 
 Helen Haye as Lady Witheringham 
 Cicely Paget-Bowman as Mrs. Hammerbrook 
 Karel Stepanek as Radek 
 Nicholas Bruce as Alek 
 Cyril Smith as Detective Inspector
 Janette Scott as Coupie, Aunt Jessica's grandchild (uncredited)

Production
The producers were careful to cut mentions in the film of the British traitors during the Second World War, such as John Amery and Norman Baillie-Stewart, out of fear of litigation by their families. An indirect mention of Baillie-Stewart remained in the film, however, with him being referred to not by name but simply as "that fellow in the Tower". The plot of the film also bore some similarities to the later case of the Cambridge Spies, including Donald MacLean.

Reception
The film created some controversy over the age difference between Robert Taylor, who was in his late 30s, and Elizabeth Taylor, who was only 16 at the time of production.

According to MGM records, the film earned $859,000 in the US and Canada and $732,000 overseas and resulted in a loss to the studio of $804,000.

See also
 List of British films of 1949

References

Additional sources

External links
 
 
 
 
 

1949 films
1940s spy thriller films
British spy thriller films
Cold War spy films
1940s English-language films
Films directed by Victor Saville
Metro-Goldwyn-Mayer films
Films set in London
British black-and-white films
Films based on British novels
Films shot in Norfolk
1940s British films